The Kankali are a Muslim  community found in the state of Uttar Pradesh in India.  They are also known as Kankal and Mangta. They are not to be confused with the Kankalis, nomad tribe of Central Asia.

Origin 
The word kankali is said to be derived from the Hindi word kangal, meaning a pauper. This is said to refer to the fact that the Kankali were once a community of professional beggars. They are found mainly in the districts of Bahraich, Basti, Gorakhpur and Gonda. The Kankali speak Awadhi among themselves and Hindi with outsiders.

Present Circumstances 

The Kankali are strictly endogamous and marry close kin. Although they live in multi-caste and multi-religious villages, but occupy their own quarters. However, there is little interaction with neighbouring Muslim communities such as the Muker and Baghban. The Kankali are Sunni, but still follow many folk beliefs.

The Kankali are a landless community, and were historically involved in singing and entertaining their patrons. Their patrons belonged mainly to caste Hindu communities such as the Brahmin, Thakur, Kayastha and Kurmi, who paid them in the form of uncooked food. Most Kankali are now landless agricultural labourers.

See also 

Muslim Raibhat

References 

Social groups of Uttar Pradesh
Dalit Muslim
Muslim communities of Uttar Pradesh
Muslim communities of India